John Anthony William Gardner is an Australian politician representing the seat of Morialta in the South Australian House of Assembly for the South Australian Division of the Liberal Party of Australia since the 2010 election. Gardner served as the Minister for Education in the Marshall Ministry between March 2018 and March 2022.

Political career
The new seat of Morialta to replace Coles was won by Liberal incumbent Joan Hall on a two-party vote of 54.1 percent at the 2002 election. Labor's Lindsay Simmons defeated Hall at the 2006 election with 57.9 percent of the two-party vote, an 11.2-point post-redistribution swing. Gardner defeated Simmons at the 2010 election, receiving 54.1 percent of the two-party vote, an 11.1-point post-redistribution swing. He increased his two-party vote to 60 percent at the 2014 election.

Gardner had previously been a senior staffer for Christopher Pyne, Liberal MP for the federal seat of Sturt. Gardner lives in his childhood suburb of Rostrevor within the electorate of Morialta.

In January 2016 Gardner was appointed Shadow Minister for Education, Multicultural affairs and Arts.

After Deputy Liberal Leader Dan van Holst Pellekaan lost his seat at the 2022 South Australian state election, Gardener was elected Deputy Leader in his place, and hence Deputy Leader of the Opposition.

References

External links
 
 

Living people
Year of birth missing (living people)
Members of the South Australian House of Assembly
Liberal Party of Australia members of the Parliament of South Australia
21st-century Australian politicians
University of Adelaide alumni